is a passenger railway station located in the city of Kokubunji, Tokyo, Japan, operated by the private railway operator Seibu Railway.

Lines

Station layout
The station has two ground-level side platforms serving two tracks. The station building and entrance is located on the south side of the station, and the platforms are connected by a footbridge.

Platforms

History
Koigakubo Station opened on 10 February 1955. Access between the platforms was originally via a level crossing for passengers, but this was replaced by a footbridge in 1986. Wheelchair access in the form of ramps and lifts was added in 2006.

Station numbering was introduced on all Seibu Railway lines during fiscal 2012, with Koigakubo Station becoming "SK02".

Passenger statistics
In fiscal 2019, the station was the 63rd busiest on the Seibu network with an average of 12,851 passengers daily.  

The passenger figures for previous years are as shown below.

Surrounding area
 Kokubunji City Office

References

External links

 Seibu station information 

Stations of Seibu Railway
Railway stations in Tokyo
Railway stations in Japan opened in 1955
Seibu Kokubunji Line
Kokubunji, Tokyo